Bapalmuia serusiauxiana is a species of foliicolous lichen in the family Pilocarpaceae. Found in the Democratic Republic of the Congo, it was described as a new species in 2014 by Dries Van den Broeck, Robert Lücking, and Damien Ertz. There, it was found growing on leaves in an old secondary forest. The specific epithet honours Belgian lichenologist Emmanuël Sérusiaux, "an outstanding figure in foliicolous lichen research, especially in tropical Africa".

References

Pilocarpaceae
Lichen species
Lichens described in 2014
Lichens of the Democratic Republic of the Congo
Taxa named by Robert Lücking